High Prairie is a town in northern Alberta, Canada within Big Lakes County.

History 
Describes the nature of the surrounding countryside.  Post office opened in 1910.  Early name, Prairie River.  In 1914, the alignment of the Edmonton, Dunvegan and British Columbia Railway, later known as the Northern Alberta Railway, was chosen to go through High Prairie instead of Grouard to the northeast. As a result, many residents and businesses from Grouard relocated to High Prairie once the Edmonton, Dunvegan and British Columbia Railway was built.

With an estimated population of 600 people, High Prairie was incorporated as a village on April 6, 1945 and subsequently as a town on January 10, 1950.

Demographics 

In the 2016 Census of Population conducted by Statistics Canada, the Town of High Prairie recorded a population of 2,564 living in 949 of its 1,116 total private dwellings, a  change from its 2011 population of 2,600.

Economy 
High Prairie's main industries include agriculture, forestry, oil and gas, and service industry.

One of its main employers is the Tolko OSB Mill that was built in 1994, the plant was closed in 2008 due to the economic downturn. In 2018 the mill was reopened and now employs 174 people.
West Fraser Mills purchased the Buchanan lumber mill in 2014 and is another main employer for High Prairie with 150 employees.

Attractions 
Due to its proximity to the western shores of Lesser Slave Lake, High Prairie has a thriving tourism industry, particularly in the warmer summer months. There are many attractions at the lake, including events such as the Golden Walleye Classic.

Winagami Lake and Kimiwan Lake are within the general area where three major migration paths meet – the Central Flyway, the Mississippi Flyway, and the Pacific Flyway.

Government 
High Prairie is governed by a town council, a mayor and six council members, each of whom serve four-year terms. Federally, it is part of the Fort McMurray—Athabasca electoral district.  In the next federal election, it will become part of the newly formed riding of Peace River—Westlock.

Medical services 
The High Prairie Community Health and Wellness Clinic, which is run by Alberta Health Services (AHS), was established to replace the Associate Medical Clinic in 2014. The Community Health and Wellness Clinic, which is family-focused and includes  primary care services, has a collaborative, inter-professional healthcare team, that responds to the higher incidents of patients with chronic conditions, such as diabetes, high blood pressure, and breathing disorders in High Prairie, according to AHS. The Clinic has chronic disease management nurses and nurse practitioners (NPs), as well as physicians. In September 2014, after Dr. Danie Du Toit announced the decision to leave High Prairie and return to South Africa, the AHS announced plans to add two physicians who had been newly-recruited. By June 2017, the High Prairie Community Health and Wellness Clinic had moved from 4620 - 53 Ave, the site of the old hospital site to its new location in the their new facility in the High Prairie Health Complex. A newly-recruited doctor, who will work at the AHS Clinic, arrived on February 13, 2022, and will increase the total number of physicians in the area. High Prairie also has a privately-run clinic, the High Prairie Medical Clinic, operated for decades by Dr. Pam Edwards, who is now retired, and her partner Dr. Robin Laughlin, who has worked in High Prairie since 1975.

Media 
Media outlets serving High Prairie and surrounding area include CKVH The Fox, CIRE-TV (the local community channel), and the South Peace News, a local community newspaper.

Notable people 
 Tom Lysiak, former professional hockey player
 Randy Ragan, former professional soccer player
 Larry Shaben, Canada's first Muslim Cabinet Minister
 Cheyanne Turions, curator, artist, writer

Recognition 
In 2001, High Prairie was recognized for its state-of-the-art water treatment system and it was awarded 4 'blooms' by Communities in Bloom, a non-profit organization that encourages environmental responsibility and beautification in Canadian communities.

In popular culture 
The news satire program This Is That had an episode in which they discussed a (fictional) attempt by High Prairie to attract tourism by inventing a fake accent.

See also 
List of communities in Alberta
List of towns in Alberta

References

External links 

1945 establishments in Alberta
Big Lakes County
Towns in Alberta